Arges Type HG 84 is a family of anti-personnel fragmentation hand grenade of Pakistani and Austrian origin. It is also produced under license by Bangladesh Ordnance Factories as Arges 84 BD and Pakistan Ordnance Factories as Arges 84 P2A1.

References

Grenades
Fragmentation grenades
Hand grenades